Wang Lu (1930 – February 7, 2007) was a Chinese football player and manager.

Playing career
Wang Lu was called up to the China national football team and was the captain in 1953. In 1954, China sent China youth football team to Hungary to study, Wang Lu was the coach and captain. In 1957, he represented China in the qualification for the 1958 FIFA World Cup.

Management career
Since 1959, Wang successively served as the coach of Beijing football team, Beijing sport college team and Beijing youth team. He led the Beijing youth team won the China football league championship. He was named senior football coach in 1992.

Death
On 7 February 2007, Wang died of liver cancer in Beijing, age 77.

References

1930 births
2007 deaths
Chinese footballers
Footballers from Hebei
Chinese football managers
China international footballers
Association football forwards
Deaths from cancer in the People's Republic of China
Deaths from liver cancer